Night Watch is a 1973 mystery thriller film directed by Brian G. Hutton from a screenplay by Tony Williamson, based on the 1972 play of the same name by Lucille Fletcher The film reunited Elizabeth Taylor with co-star Laurence Harvey from their 1960 collaboration BUtterfield 8. It was the last time the pair acted together on screen. Some of the story elements recall the plot outline of the 1944 film Gaslight.

Plot
One night, during a raging thunderstorm, Ellen Wheeler frantically tells her husband, John, that from the living room window she has seen a murder being committed in the large, old, deserted house next door. John calls the police, but a search of the old house turns up nothing.

The next morning, Ellen notices a freshly planted bed of Laburnum in the garden next to the old house that was not there before. She calls the investigating detective, Inspector Walker, and suggests that the body of the murder victim she witnessed may be buried there. Inspector Walker then questions the nextdoor neighbor of the old house, Mr. Appleby, who confirms that he planted the trees the night before during the storm, but refuses to let the police search the garden or dig up the trees.

Ellen is revealed to be recovering from a mental breakdown that occurred after her unfaithful first husband, Carl, was killed a few years earlier in an auto accident with his paramour. Ellen was traumatized by having to identify the bodies in the local morgue. Inspector Walker confides to John that Ellen may be mentally ill and suggests rest and a doctor. Ellen continues to maintain that she saw a murder in the deserted house, but there is no proof and John remains skeptical. Ellen's visiting friend Sarah Cooke is equally skeptical and tries humoring Ellen by suggesting that she sees what she thinks she sees because of her recent breakdown.

When both Ellen and Sarah see a man enter the old house the following night, they call the police, who find Mr. Appleby wandering around with a flashlight and arrest him for trespassing. A second search of the house and excavation of the garden reveal nothing, and Inspector Walker closes the case.

John sees a psychiatrist friend of his, Tony. After learning about the death of Ellen's first husband and her nervous breakdown, Tony suggests going to a clinic in another country for a few weeks. Ellen agrees to do so. That evening, Ellen claims to John and Sarah that she saw another body in the old house next door, that of a woman. Ellen is then sedated by John and Sarah, who think that Ellen may be losing her mind.

The following evening, as Ellen prepares to leave for the airport, John asks her to sign several financial documents, including one that grants him power of attorney over their financial holdings; she complies. But she notices in the financial documents that John had recently acquired a company that owns the deserted house; she suddenly angrily confronts him with that knowledge and the key to the house, accusing him and Sarah of having an affair and plotting to drive her mad in order to have her committed. John still denies cheating on her or having anything to do with the murders she claimed to have seen, but Ellen refuses to accept their denials. She runs to the old house and lets herself inside using the key, and both John and Sarah chase after her. Ellen lures both of them to the second-floor room where she claimed to have seen the bodies, and violently attacks and stabs both of them to death with a butcher knife, positioning them in exactly the same manner that she claimed to have seen the two bodies.

The film's denouement reveals that Ellen had only pretended to be insane by claiming to have seen two murders in the house next door as part of a complex scheme of hers to murder both John and Sarah for their affair, and to so weary the police with her repeated frantic phone calls to them that they would never again bother to investigate the house and find the bodies of John and Sarah. Mr. Appleby, who had grown up in John and Ellen's house before they purchased it, makes a surprise appearance, startling Ellen and congratulating her on pulling off her complex scheme. After informing her that he won't go to the police because Inspector Walker wouldn't believe him either, Ellen invites Mr. Appleby to look after her house as well as the garden until she returns. Mr. Appleby happily agrees to do so as Ellen bids him goodbye and departs.

Cast

Original play
Night Watch was based on a play by Lucille Fletcher, known for writing the screenplay for Sorry, Wrong Number. The play starred Joan Hackett. Rehearsals began January 1972. It opened the following month. The New York Times called it "a most excellent thriller... a first class example of its genre".

Production
Film rights to the play were bought prior to the play reaching Broadway by producer Martin Poll. He set up the film at Brut Productions, a newly formed film division of the Fabergé Company, run by George Barrie. It was one of the first films from that company.

Poll said, "It's really a lot more now than a suspense story. It deals with the relationship between people torn by their emotions, their betrayals and jealousies."

It was decided to relocate the story to England. It was filmed at Elstree Studios in London. Brut financed the entire film, with Taylor taking a smaller salary in exchange for a larger percentage. Director Brian Hutton had just made Zee and Co. (also titled X Y and Zee) with Taylor. Harvey's casting was announced in April 1972. George Barrie would later finance Harvey's last movie, Welcome to Arrow Beach.

Filming was interrupted several times. It shut down for a week when Hutton contracted bronchitis, and then later for six more weeks so Harvey could have an operation on his stomach. Harvey said at the time that the operation was due to appendicitis, but it was in fact stomach cancer, which would soon kill him. Filming ended in September 1972.

Although George Barrie and John Cameron composed the musical score of the film, and Cameron was credited for it, the background music for a good part of the film is Brahms' Piano Concerto No. 2 and Schubert's Unfinished Symphony.

In February 1973, Avco Embassy agreed to distribute the film along with another Brut Production, A Touch of Class.

Critical reception
Time Out called it a "tired, old-fashioned thriller"; whereas The New York Times wrote "Elizabeth Taylor, and about time, has got herself a good picture and a whodunit at that"; and Variety opined "Lucille Fletcher’s Night Watch isn’t the first average stage play to be turned into a better than average film. Astute direction and an improved cast more than help".

Notes

References

Externallinks 
 
 
 
 

1973 films
1973 crime films
1973 horror films
1970s crime thriller films
1970s English-language films
1970s horror thriller films
1970s mystery thriller films
American crime thriller films
American films based on plays
American horror thriller films
American mystery horror films
American mystery thriller films
British crime thriller films
British films based on plays
British horror thriller films
British mystery thriller films
Embassy Pictures films
Films directed by Brian G. Hutton
Films scored by John Cameron
Films shot at EMI-Elstree Studios
Psycho-biddy films
1970s American films
1970s British films